Oxobacter is a genus of Gram-positive obligately anaerobic rod-shaped acetogenic bacteria. The sole species in the genus is Oxobacter pfennigii, formerly known as Clostridium pfennigii. This endospore-forming microorganism catabolizes pyruvate to acetate and CO2, while sugars and amino acids  are not utilized as energy sources.

References

Clostridiaceae
Monotypic bacteria genera
Bacteria genera